Roundmound is a ghost town in Round Mound Township, Osborne County, Kansas, United States.

History
Round Mound was issued a post office in 1879. The post office was renamed Roundmound in 1894. The post office was discontinued in 1904.  There is nothing left of Roundmound.

References

Former populated places in Osborne County, Kansas
Former populated places in Kansas